State Road 550 exists in two portions.  The western section is completely within Knox County and has a western terminus east of Emison at U.S. Route 41/U.S. Route 150 and runs southeasterly to the U.S. Route 50/US 150 concurrency in Wheatland. The eastern section terminates at both ends at US 150 in Martin County between Loogootee and Lacy.

Route description

Western segment
The western segment of SR 550 begins at an intersection with US 41/US 150.  SR 550 heads southeast towards Wheatland passing through an intersection with State Road 67 in Bruceville. SR 550 enters Wheatland on the northwest side of town and heads towards its eastern terminus of this section at an intersection with US 50/US 150

Eastern segment
The eastern section of SR 550 begins in Loogootee, east of the US 50/US 150/U.S. Route 231 intersection.  SR 550 heads southeast then turning east.  The eastern terminus of SR 550 is at an intersection with US 150.

Major intersections

References

 Indiana Highway Ends - SR 550

External links

550
Transportation in Knox County, Indiana
Transportation in Martin County, Indiana